The UK Singles Chart is one of many music charts compiled by the Official Charts Company that calculates the best-selling singles of the week in the United Kingdom. Since 2004 the chart has been based on the sales of both physical singles and digital downloads, with airplay figures excluded from the official chart.  This list shows singles that peaked in the Top 10 of the UK Singles Chart during 2006, as well as singles which peaked in 2005 but were in the top 10 in 2006. The entry date is when the song appeared in the top 10 for the first time (week ending, as published by the Official Charts Company, which is six days after the chart is announced).

One-hundred and sixty-nine singles were in the top ten in 2006. Nine singles from 2005 remained in the top 10 for several weeks at the beginning of the year. "When I'm Gone" by Eminem was the only song from 2005 to reach its peak in 2006. Forty-two artists scored multiple entries in the top 10 in 2006. Amy Winehouse, Fall Out Boy, Lily Allen, Ne-Yo and Timbaland were among the many artists who achieved their first UK charting top 10 single in 2006.

The 2005 Christmas number-one, "That's My Goal" by 2005 X Factor winner Shayne Ward, remained at number-one for the first three weeks of 2006. The first new number-one single of the year was "When the Sun Goes Down" by Arctic Monkeys. Overall, twenty-five different singles peaked at number-one in 2006, with McFly (2) having the most singles hit that position.

Background

Multiple entries
One-hundred and sixty-nine singles charted in 2006, with one-hundred and sixty singles reaching their peak this year (including the re-entries "Fairytale of New York", "Three Lions", "You Got the Love" and "You Spin Me Round" which charted in previous years but reached peaks on their latest chart run).

Forty-two artists scored multiple entries in the top 10 in 2006. American singer Nicole Scherzinger of The Pussycat Dolls had the most top ten singles in 2006 with five. Four of the singles were with her band, the exception being "Come to Me", her debut solo single and a collaboration with P. Diddy. The single peaked at number 4 on 14 October 2006, its first week of release, and spent four weeks in the top 10 in total. The best-performing single with The Pussycat Dolls was "Stickwitu" which had peaked at number-one in 2005. "Beep" reached a high of number 2, "Buttons" landed one place lower and "I Don't Need a Man" was at number seven.

Five artists made the top 10 on four occasions in 2006, including The Pussycat Dolls as a group. British girlband Girls Aloud's tally again included a holdover from 2005, their number 9 hit "See the Day". "Whole Lotta History" went to number six in March, "Something Kinda Oooh" was a top 3 entry in October, while the group finished the year with their number four cover of "I Think We're Alone Now", best known as a hit for Tiffany in 1987.

Madonna had another year of chart success. "Hung Up" had topped the rankings in 2005 but she also had three new entries in 2006. "Sorry" made number-one for a single week on 4 March 2006, "Get Together" reached number seven in August and "Jump" squeezed in at number 9 in November.

Fergie and will.i.am of The Black Eyed Peas were the final artists with four top 10 hits this year. will.i.am guested on The Pussycat Dolls' "Buttons", while the other three singles were as part of the band. "My Humps" and "Pump It" both reached number three, and they also got together with Sergio Mendes for a new interpretation of his song Mas Que Nada, taking it to number 6 in July. Fergie's other hit single was her solo debut "London Bridge", which peaked at number three.

Boyband McFly were one of a number of artists with three top-ten entries, including number-one singles "Star Girl" and "Don't Stop Me Now"/"Please, Please" (for Sport Relief). Christina Aguilera, Beyoncé, The Black Eyed Peas, The Feeling, Nelly Furtado, The Ordinary Boys, P. Diddy, Pink and Sugababes were among the other artists who had multiple top 10 entries in 2006.

Chart debuts
Sixty-five artists achieved their first top 10 single in 2006, either as a lead or featured artist. Of these, ten went on to record another hit single that year: Beatfreakz, Fall Out Boy, The Fratellis, Gnarls Barkley, James Morrison, The Kooks, Lily Allen, Ne-Yo, Sunblock and The Zutons. The Feeling and The Ordinary Boys both had two other entries in their breakthrough year.

The following table (collapsed on desktop site) does not include acts who had previously charted as part of a group and secured their first top 10 solo single.

Notes
The dance music production team Klubbheads previously charted at number 10 with "Klubbhopping" in 1996 but entered the chart under the alias Hi-Tack for the first time in 2006. Liz McClarnon had multiple chart entries, including three number-ones, as part of Atomic Kitten, but "Woman in Love"/"I Get the Sweetest Feeling" marked her solo chart debut.

will.i.am recorded his first single independent of The Black Eyed Peas, guesting on The Pussycat Dolls song "Buttons" which peaked at number two. Fellow bandmate Fergie also launched her solo career in 2006 with "London Bridge", a number three entry. The Raconteurs included Jack White, who was also a member of The White Stripes. His first chart hit was "Seven Nation Army" in 2003 but "Steady, As She Goes" was his first single with his new band.

Matt Willis tasted chart success outside Busted for the first time in 2006, as "Up All Night" reached number 7. Cherise Roberts and Nadia Shepherd charted under the name Booty Luv, having previously recorded hit singles as part of Big Brovaz.

Nicole Scherzinger of The Pussycat Dolls collaborated with P. Diddy on "Come to Me" in 2006.

Songs from films
Original songs from various films entered the top 10 throughout the year. These included "Breaking Free" (from High School Musical), "You Know My Name" (Casino Royale), and "Friday Night" (Night at the Museum). "Check on It" was also recorded for The Pink Panther but never made the soundtrack.

Charity singles
A number of singles recorded for charity reached the top 10 in the charts in 2006. The Sport Relief single was the double-A side "Don't Stop Me Now" (a cover of the Queen song) and "Please, Please" by McFly, peaking at number on one 29 July 2006.

Emma Bunton recorded the Children in Need single for 2006, a cover of the Petula Clark song "Downtown". It was the eighth solo top 10 single of her career and reached number three on 2 December 2006.

U2 and Green Day produced the single "The Saints Are Coming", in aid of relief efforts following Hurricane Katrina, which caused destruction and devastation especially in New Orleans but also across the United States. It peaked at number two on its second week of release, on 18 November 2006.

Best-selling singles
Gnarls Barkley had the best-selling single of the year with "Crazy". The song spent eleven weeks in the top 10 (including nine weeks at number one), sold about 820,000 copies and was certified by the BPI. "A Moment Like This" by Leona Lewis came in second place, selling more than 700,000 copies and losing out by around 120,000 sales. Shakira featuring Wyclef Jean's "Hips Don't Lie", "I Don't Feel Like Dancin'" from Scissor Sisters and "I Wish I Was a Punk Rocker (With Flowers in My Hair)" by Sandi Thom made up the top five. Singles by Infernal, Nelly Furtado, Take That, Rihanna and Justin Timberlake were also in the top ten best-selling singles of the year.

Top-ten singles
Key

Entries by artist

The following table shows artists who achieved two or more top 10 entries in 2006, including singles that reached their peak in 2005. The figures include both main artists and featured artists, while appearances on ensemble charity records are also counted for each artist. The total number of weeks an artist spent in the top ten in 2006 is also shown.

Notes

 "You Spin Me Round (Like a Record)" originally peaked at number-one upon its initial release in 1985. The song re-entered the top 10 at number 5 on 11 February 2006 (week ending) for three weeks after it was re-released following Pete Burns' appearance on Celebrity Big Brother. 
 The original solo version of "You Got the Love" by Candi Staton peaked at number 95 in 1986. The remixed version by The Source peaked at number 4 for two weeks in 1991. A 1997 remix by New Voyager saw the song reach a new peak of number 3.
 "Three Lions" was released for the first time ahead of Euro 96, reaching number-one on 1 June 1996 (week ending) and for another week on 6 July 1996 (week ending).
 "Hips Don't Lie" spent a single week at number-one on 8 July 2006 (week ending). It returned for a further four week spell on 5 August 2006 (week ending).
 Released as the official single for Sport Relief.
 "Chasing Cars" re-entered the top 10 at number 9 on 13 January 2007 (week ending).
 "Something Kinda Oooh" re-entered the top 10 at number 9 on 2 December 2006 (week ending).
 Released as a charity single to aid relief efforts following Hurricane Katrina.
 "Patience" re-entered the top 10 at number ten on 24 February 2007 (week ending).
 Released as the official single for Children in Need.
 "Fairytale of New York" was originally released in 1987, charting at number two for two weeks on 26 December 1987 (week ending).
 Figure includes song that peaked in 2005.
 Figure includes four top 10 singles with the group The Pussycat Dolls.
 Figure includes appearance on Diddy's "Come to Me".
 Figure includes three top 10 singles with the group The Black Eyed Peas.
 Figure includes appearance on Sergio Mendes' "Mas Que Nada".
 Figure includes appearance on The Pussycat Dolls' "Beep".
 Figure includes appearance on The Notorious B.I.G.'s "Nasty Girl".
 Figure includes appearance on Akon's "Smack That".
 Figure includes song that first charted in 2005 but peaked in 2006.
 Figure includes appearance on The Pogues' "Fairytale of New York".
 "Fairytale of New York" re-entered the Top 10 on 23 December 2006 at number 10 and climbed to number 6 the following week.
 "Teenage Life" was the United Kingdom's entry at the Eurovision Song Contest in 2006.

See also
2006 in British music
List of number-one singles from the 2000s (UK)

References
General

Specific

External links
2006 singles chart archive at the Official Charts Company (click on relevant week)

United Kingdom Top Ten
2006 in British music
2006